William Sydney Wilson (November 7, 1816 – November 3, 1862) was an American politician.

Biography
He was born in Snow Hill, Maryland, and later moved to Mississippi. He was the son of Ephraim King Wilson and brother to Ephraim King Wilson II. He was a member of the Mississippi State Legislature from 1858 to 1859 and 1860 to 1861. He represented the state in the Provisional Congress of the Confederate States from February 4, 1861, to March 16, 1861. He later joined the Confederate States Army and was mortally wounded at the Battle of Antietam.

References

External links

1816 births
1862 deaths
19th-century American politicians
Burials in Maryland
Deputies and delegates to the Provisional Congress of the Confederate States
Members of the Mississippi Legislature
People from Snow Hill, Maryland
People of Mississippi in the American Civil War
Signers of the Confederate States Constitution
Signers of the Provisional Constitution of the Confederate States
United States politicians killed during the Civil War